Rex 84, short for Readiness Exercise 1984, was a classified scenario and drill developed by the United States federal government to detain large numbers of United States citizens deemed to be "national security threats" in the event that the president declared a National Emergency. The plan was first revealed in detail in a major daily newspaper by reporter Alfonso Chardy in the July 5, 1987 edition of the Miami Herald. Possible reasons for such a roundup were reported to be widespread opposition to a U.S. military invasion abroad, such as if the United States were to directly invade Central America. To combat what the government perceived as "subversive activities", the plan also authorized the military to direct ordered movements of civilian populations at state and regional levels, according to Professor Diana Reynolds.

Existence of master military contingency plans (of which REX-84 was a part), "Operation Garden Plot" and a similar earlier exercise, "Lantern Spike", were originally revealed by journalist Ron Ridenhour, who summarized his findings in an article in CounterSpy.

Transcripts from the Iran–Contra hearings in 1987 record the following dialogue between Congressman Jack Brooks, Oliver North's attorney Brendan Sullivan, and Senator Daniel Inouye, the Democratic Chair of the joint Senate–House Committee:

Contingency plans by the US Government for rounding up people perceived by the government to be subversive or a threat to civil order have existed for many decades. For example, from 1967 to 1971, the FBI kept a list of over 100,000 people to be rounded up as subversive, dubbed the "ADEX" list.

See also
 COINTELPRO
 FEMA
 Huston Plan
 Main Core
 Mariel boatlift
 No Fly List
 Non-Detention Act
 NSPD-51
 Palmer Raids
 Posse Comitatus Act
 Terrorist Screening Database
 Violent Radicalization and Homegrown Terrorism Prevention Act of 2007

References

See also  "Martial Law Concerns," Congressman Jim McDermott, House of Representatives, March 11, 2003.

External links
 Article by Frank Morales about Operation Garden Plot, the larger operation of which Rex 84 was a part. An edited version of this article appears in CovertAction Quarterly, #69 Spring/Summer 2000.
 "Foundations are in place for martial law in the US," Ritt Goldstein, Sydney Morning Herald, July 27, 2002

Civil detention in the United States
Riots and civil disorder in the United States
Continuity of government in the United States